Marrow Bone Spring Archeological Site is located in Vandergriff Park in Arlington, Texas, United States.  It was added to the National Register of Historic Places in November 21, 1978.

Photo gallery

See also

National Register of Historic Places listings in Tarrant County, Texas

References

External links

Archaeological sites on the National Register of Historic Places in Texas
Arlington, Texas
Geography of Tarrant County, Texas
National Register of Historic Places in Tarrant County, Texas